The Pakistan Army Air Defence Command ,(Urdu: ﺁرمى أير ڈفينص کمانڈ; Army Air Defence Command, abbreviated as AADC) (not to be mixed with Pakistan Army Air Defence Corps which is an Administrative Corps), is an active military combatant corps of the Pakistan Army and a major combative formation tasked with air defences of strategic assets of Pakistan from foreign Aerial threats.
Army Air Defence Command was formed and headquartered at the Chaklala Army Cantonment in Rawalpindi, Punjab Province of Pakistan. following military exercises where Pakistan's military learned of its weakness in providing air cover over a moving battlefield. Air Defence Command consists of a total of five military divisions spread across two geographic districts; one tasked with air defence of the northern region of Pakistan headquartered in Lahore and the other with the southern region commanded from Quetta.

Present day and order of battle
HQ ADC, Rawalpindi
3rd Air Defence Division, Sargodha
 3rd Air Defence Brigade (largest Brigade of Pakistan army) 
4th Air Defence Division, Malir
 Army Air Defence Corps:
 Medium AD Regiment 
 Light AD Regiment
 GunMissile Regiment (Light)|GunMissile AD Regiment
 Self Propelled AD Regiment
 SAM Regiment
 Missile Regiment
 Radar Controlled Gun Regiment
 Surveillance Controlling Reporting Regiment

See also
 Pakistan Army Air Defence Corps

References

Commands of Pakistan Army
Air defence commands (military formations)
Military units and formations established in 1999
1999 establishments in Pakistan